Glipa watanabeorum is a species of beetle in the genus Glipa. It was described in 2002.

References

watanabeorum
Beetles described in 2002